Gonzalo Parra-Aranguren (5 December 1928 – 3 December 2016) was a judge at the International Court of Justice in The Hague, Netherlands. He was born in Caracas, Venezuela, and was married to María Trinidad Pulido Santana. He served as a Professor at The Hague Academy of International Law in 1988. He is the author of numerous legal textbooks.

Works

 Die Regel "Locus Regit Actum" und die Formen der Testamente, 1955
 La Nacionalidad Venezolana Originaria, Vols. I and II, 1964
 La Constitución de 1830 y los Venezolanos por Naturalización, 1969
 Codificación del Derecho Internacional Privado en América, Vol. I, 1982; Vol. II, 1998
 La Nacionalidad Venezolana: I. Antecedentes Históricos, 1983
 La Influencia del Matrimonio sobre la Nacionalidad de la Mujer en la Legislación Venezolana, 1983
 La Nacionalidad Venezolana: II. Problemas Actuales, 1983
 Monografías Selectas de Derecho Internacional Privado, 1984
 Ensayos de Derecho Procesal Civil Internacional, 1986
 Curso General de Derecho Internacional Privado (Problemas Selectos), 1991
 Curso General de Derecho Internacional Privado. Problemas Selectos y Otros Estudios, 1992
 Curso General de Derecho Internacional Privado. Problemas Selectos y Otros Estudios, Tercera Edición, 1998
 Estudios de Derecho Procesal Civil Internacional, 1998
 Escritos Diversos de Derecho Internacional Privado, 1998
 Estudios de Derecho Mercantil Internacional, 1998
 El Régimen de los Bienes en el Matrimonio en el Derecho Internacional Privado Venezolano, 2007
 Padrino de la Promoción de abogados que lleva su nombre del año 1963 de la Universidad Central de Venezuela, Caracas
 Padrino de la Promoción de abogados que lleva su nombre del año 1979 de la Universidad Católica Andrés Bello''', Caracas

See also 

 Judges of the International Court of Justice

References

External links
Biography from the ICJ-website

1928 births
2016 deaths
People from Caracas
International Court of Justice judges
The Hague Academy of International Law people
20th-century Venezuelan judges
Venezuelan judges of United Nations courts and tribunals
Venezuelan expatriates in the Netherlands